The 5th constituency of the Bas-Rhin is a French legislative constituency in the Bas-Rhin département.

Description

The 5th Constituency of Bas-Rhin covers the southern portion of the Département including nearly the entire of the Arrondissement of Sélestat-Erstein excluding only Obernai.

The seat has traditionally been a stronghold of the right since its inception and was held by the Gaullist UMP/LR from 2002 to 2022, when the seat was gained by the moderate right Agir party, as part of Emmanuel Macron's centrist Ensemble Citoyens alliance.

Historic representation

Election results

2022

 
 
|-
| colspan="8" bgcolor="#E9E9E9"|
|-

2017

|- style="background-color:#E9E9E9;text-align:center;"
! colspan="2" rowspan="2" style="text-align:left;" | Candidate
! rowspan="2" colspan="2" style="text-align:left;" | Party
! colspan="2" | 1st round
! colspan="2" | 2nd round
|- style="background-color:#E9E9E9;text-align:center;"
! width="75" | Votes
! width="30" | %
! width="75" | Votes
! width="30" | %
|-
| style="background-color:" |
| style="text-align:left;" | Antoine Herth
| style="text-align:left;" | The Republicans
| LR
| 
| 37.59
| 
| 54.14
|-
| style="background-color:" |
| style="text-align:left;" | Gérard Simler
| style="text-align:left;" | Regionalist
| REG
| 
| 16.85
| 
| 45.86
|-
| style="background-color:" |
| style="text-align:left;" | Eliane Klein
| style="text-align:left;" | National Front
| FN
| 
| 15.91
| colspan="2" style="text-align:left;" |
|-
| style="background-color:" |
| style="text-align:left;" | Caroline Reys
| style="text-align:left;" | Ecologist
| ECO
| 
| 9.06
| colspan="2" style="text-align:left;" |
|-
| style="background-color:" |
| style="text-align:left;" | Janig Terrier
| style="text-align:left;" | La France Insoumise
| FI
| 
| 8.35
| colspan="2" style="text-align:left;" |
|-
| style="background-color:" |
| style="text-align:left;" | Christian Dantz
| style="text-align:left;" | Ecologist
| ECO
| 
| 3.31
| colspan="2" style="text-align:left;" |
|-
| style="background-color:" |
| style="text-align:left;" | Daniel Weber
| style="text-align:left;" | Ecologist
| ECO
| 
| 2.21
| colspan="2" style="text-align:left;" |
|-
| style="background-color:" |
| style="text-align:left;" | Christine Beccari
| style="text-align:left;" | Debout la France
| DLF
| 
| 2.18
| colspan="2" style="text-align:left;" |
|-
| style="background-color:" |
| style="text-align:left;" | Christine Romanus
| style="text-align:left;" | Communist Party
| PCF
| 
| 0.92
| colspan="2" style="text-align:left;" |
|-
| style="background-color:" |
| style="text-align:left;" | Patrick Dutter
| style="text-align:left;" | Far Left
| EXG
| 
| 0.92
| colspan="2" style="text-align:left;" |
|-
| style="background-color:" |
| style="text-align:left;" | Candice Vetroff
| style="text-align:left;" | Independent
| DIV
| 
| 0.83
| colspan="2" style="text-align:left;" |
|-
| style="background-color:" |
| style="text-align:left;" | Eric Gautier
| style="text-align:left;" | Far Right
| EXD
| 
| 0.69
| colspan="2" style="text-align:left;" |
|-
| style="background-color:" |
| style="text-align:left;" | Eric Lapp-Lauth
| style="text-align:left;" | Independent
| DIV
| 
| 0.63
| colspan="2" style="text-align:left;" |
|-
| style="background-color:" |
| style="text-align:left;" | Feridun Ulusoy
| style="text-align:left;" | Independent
| DIV
| 
| 0.56
| colspan="2" style="text-align:left;" |
|-
| colspan="8" style="background-color:#E9E9E9;"|
|- style="font-weight:bold"
| colspan="4" style="text-align:left;" | Total
| 
| 100%
| 
| 100%
|-
| colspan="8" style="background-color:#E9E9E9;"|
|-
| colspan="4" style="text-align:left;" | Registered voters
| 
| style="background-color:#E9E9E9;"|
| 
| style="background-color:#E9E9E9;"|
|-
| colspan="4" style="text-align:left;" | Blank/Void ballots
| 
| 3.82%
| 
| 8.43%
|-
| colspan="4" style="text-align:left;" | Turnout
| 
| 44.80%
| 
| 37.84%
|-
| colspan="4" style="text-align:left;" | Abstentions
| 
| 55.20%
| 
| 62.16%
|-
| colspan="8" style="background-color:#E9E9E9;"|
|- style="font-weight:bold"
| colspan="6" style="text-align:left;" | Result
| colspan="2" style="background-color:" | LR GAIN FROM UMP
|}

2012

|- style="background-color:#E9E9E9;text-align:center;"
! colspan="2" rowspan="2" style="text-align:left;" | Candidate
! rowspan="2" colspan="2" style="text-align:left;" | Party
! colspan="2" | 1st round
! colspan="2" | 2nd round
|- style="background-color:#E9E9E9;text-align:center;"
! width="75" | Votes
! width="30" | %
! width="75" | Votes
! width="30" | %
|-
| style="background-color:" |
| style="text-align:left;" | Antoine Herth
| style="text-align:left;" | Union for a Presidential Majority
| UMP
| 
| 49.31
| 
| 67.78
|-
| style="background-color:" |
| style="text-align:left;" | Daniel Ehret
| style="text-align:left;" | Europe Ecology - The Greens
| EELV
| 
| 22.20
| 
| 32.22
|-
| style="background-color:" |
| style="text-align:left;" | Christian Cotelle
| style="text-align:left;" | National Front
| FN
| 
| 19.25
| colspan="2" style="text-align:left;" |
|-
| style="background-color:" |
| style="text-align:left;" | Michel Gilardeau
| style="text-align:left;" | The Centre for France
| CEN
| 
| 2.61
| colspan="2" style="text-align:left;" |
|-
| style="background-color:" |
| style="text-align:left;" | Ariane Henry
| style="text-align:left;" | Left Front
| FG
| 
| 2.54
| colspan="2" style="text-align:left;" |
|-
| style="background-color:" |
| style="text-align:left;" | Daniel Webber
| style="text-align:left;" | Ecologist
| ECO
| 
| 2.02
| colspan="2" style="text-align:left;" |
|-
| style="background-color:" |
| style="text-align:left;" | Patrick Dutter
| style="text-align:left;" | Far Left
| EXG
| 
| 1.04
| colspan="2" style="text-align:left;" |
|-
| style="background-color:" |
| style="text-align:left;" | Christophe Palisser
| style="text-align:left;" | Other
| AUT
| 
| 1.02
| colspan="2" style="text-align:left;" |
|-
| style="background-color:" |
| style="text-align:left;" | Emmanuel Wingender
| style="text-align:left;" | Other
| AUT
| 
| 0.00
| colspan="2" style="text-align:left;" |
|-
| colspan="8" style="background-color:#E9E9E9;"|
|- style="font-weight:bold"
| colspan="4" style="text-align:left;" | Total
| 
| 100%
| 
| 100%
|-
| colspan="8" style="background-color:#E9E9E9;"|
|-
| colspan="4" style="text-align:left;" | Registered voters
| 
| style="background-color:#E9E9E9;"|
| 
| style="background-color:#E9E9E9;"|
|-
| colspan="4" style="text-align:left;" | Blank/Void ballots
| 
| 1.79%
| 
| 3.37%
|-
| colspan="4" style="text-align:left;" | Turnout
| 
| 55.39%
| 
| 49.74%
|-
| colspan="4" style="text-align:left;" | Abstentions
| 
| 44.61%
| 
| 50.26%
|-
| colspan="8" style="background-color:#E9E9E9;"|
|- style="font-weight:bold"
| colspan="6" style="text-align:left;" | Result
| colspan="2" style="background-color:" | UMP HOLD
|}

2007
Antoine Herth was elected with more than 50% of the vote in the first round of voting, and therefore no second round took place.

|- style="background-color:#E9E9E9;text-align:center;"
! colspan="2" rowspan="2" style="text-align:left;" | Candidate
! rowspan="2" colspan="2" style="text-align:left;" | Party
! colspan="2" | 1st round
|- style="background-color:#E9E9E9;text-align:center;"
! width="75" | Votes
! width="30" | %
|-
| style="background-color:" |
| style="text-align:left;" | Antoine Herth
| style="text-align:left;" | Union for a Popular Movement
| UMP
| 
| 58.01
|-
| style="background-color:" |
| style="text-align:left;" | Danièle Meyer
| style="text-align:left;" | UDF-Democratic Movement
| UDF-MoDem
| 
| 12.63
|-
| style="background-color:" |
| style="text-align:left;" | Christiane Hamman
| style="text-align:left;" | Socialist Party
| PS
| 
| 10.32
|-
| style="background-color:" |
| style="text-align:left;" | Christian Cotelle
| style="text-align:left;" | National Front
| FN
| 
| 6.69
|-
| style="background-color:" |
| style="text-align:left;" | Michèle Gartner
| style="text-align:left;" | The Greens
| LV
| 
| 3.50
|-
| style="background-color:" |
| style="text-align:left;" | Clément Renaudet
| style="text-align:left;" | Ecologist
| ECO
| 
| 2.33
|-
| style="background-color:" |
| style="text-align:left;" | Monique Funck
| style="text-align:left;" | Miscellaneous Right
| DVD
| 
| 1.38
|-
| style="background-color:" |
| style="text-align:left;" | Patrick Dutter
| style="text-align:left;" | Far Left
| EXG
| 
| 1.33
|-
| style="background-color:" |
| style="text-align:left;" | Marie-Claude Richez
| style="text-align:left;" | Far Left
| EXG
| 
| 1.26
|-
| style="background-color:" |
| style="text-align:left;" | Auguste Bildstein
| style="text-align:left;" | Independent
| DIV
| 
| 0.84
|-
| style="background-color:" |
| style="text-align:left;" | Edmond Guillet
| style="text-align:left;" | Far Right
| EXD
| 
| 0.69
|-
| style="background-color:" |
| style="text-align:left;" | Jean-Louis Kubiack
| style="text-align:left;" | Communist Party
| PCF
| 
| 0.63
|-
| style="background-color:" |
| style="text-align:left;" | Gabrielle Domin
| style="text-align:left;" | Miscellaneous Left
| DVG
| 
| 0.40
|-
| colspan="6" style="background-color:#E9E9E9;"|
|- style="font-weight:bold"
| colspan="4" style="text-align:left;" | Total
| 
| 100%
|-
| colspan="6" style="background-color:#E9E9E9;"|
|-
| colspan="4" style="text-align:left;" | Registered voters
| 
| style="background-color:#E9E9E9;"|
|-
| colspan="4" style="text-align:left;" | Blank/Void ballots
| 
| 2.59%
|-
| colspan="4" style="text-align:left;" | Turnout
| 
| 55.86%
|-
| colspan="4" style="text-align:left;" | Abstentions
| 
| 44.14%
|-
| colspan="6" style="background-color:#E9E9E9;"|
|- style="font-weight:bold"
| colspan="4" style="text-align:left;" | Result
| colspan="2" style="background-color:" | UMP HOLD
|}

2002

|- style="background-color:#E9E9E9;text-align:center;"
! colspan="2" rowspan="2" style="text-align:left;" | Candidate
! rowspan="2" colspan="2" style="text-align:left;" | Party
! colspan="2" | 1st round
! colspan="2" | 2nd round
|- style="background-color:#E9E9E9;text-align:center;"
! width="75" | Votes
! width="30" | %
! width="75" | Votes
! width="30" | %
|-
| style="background-color:" |
| style="text-align:left;" | Antoine Herth
| style="text-align:left;" | Union for a Presidential Majority
| UMP
| 
| 26.82
| 
| 56.93
|-
| style="background-color:" |
| style="text-align:left;" | Alfred Becker
| style="text-align:left;" | Miscellaneous Right
| DVD
| 
| 24.28
| 
| 43.07
|-
| style="background-color:" |
| style="text-align:left;" | Christian Cotelle
| style="text-align:left;" | National Front
| FN
| 
| 13.81
| colspan="2" style="text-align:left;" |
|-
| style="background-color:" |
| style="text-align:left;" | Christiane Hamman
| style="text-align:left;" | Socialist Party
| PS
| 
| 13.59
| colspan="2" style="text-align:left;" |
|-
| style="background-color:" |
| style="text-align:left;" | Gerard Simler
| style="text-align:left;" | Miscellaneous Right
| DVD
| 
| 8.90
| colspan="2" style="text-align:left;" |
|-
| style="background-color:" |
| style="text-align:left;" | Michele Gartner
| style="text-align:left;" | The Greens
| LV
| 
| 2.93
| colspan="2" style="text-align:left;" |
|-
| style="background-color:" |
| style="text-align:left;" | Christian Dantz
| style="text-align:left;" | Ecologist
| ECO
| 
| 1.59
| colspan="2" style="text-align:left;" |
|-
| style="background-color:" |
| style="text-align:left;" | Christian Hager
| style="text-align:left;" | National Republican Movement
| MNR
| 
| 1.50
| colspan="2" style="text-align:left;" |
|-
| style="background-color:" |
| style="text-align:left;" | Patrick Dutter
| style="text-align:left;" | Workers’ Struggle
| LO
| 
| 1.48
| colspan="2" style="text-align:left;" |
|-
| style="background-color:" |
| style="text-align:left;" | Laure Kretz
| style="text-align:left;" | Republican Pole
| PR
| 
| 1.02
| colspan="2" style="text-align:left;" |
|-
| style="background-color:" |
| style="text-align:left;" | Christian Jaeg
| style="text-align:left;" | Miscellaneous Right
| DVD
| 
| 0.79
| colspan="2" style="text-align:left;" |
|-
| style="background-color:" |
| style="text-align:left;" | Michel Schulz
| style="text-align:left;" | Movement for France
| MPF
| 
| 0.77
| colspan="2" style="text-align:left;" |
|-
| style="background-color:" |
| style="text-align:left;" | Francois Waag
| style="text-align:left;" | Regionalist
| REG
| 
| 0.67
| colspan="2" style="text-align:left;" |
|-
| style="background-color:" |
| style="text-align:left;" | Andre Hemmerle
| style="text-align:left;" | Communist Party
| PCF
| 
| 0.65
| colspan="2" style="text-align:left;" |
|-
| style="background-color:" |
| style="text-align:left;" | Remi Freixinos
| style="text-align:left;" | Independent
| DIV
| 
| 0.49
| colspan="2" style="text-align:left;" |
|-
| style="background-color:" |
| style="text-align:left;" | Cyrille Hurstel
| style="text-align:left;" | Independent
| DIV
| 
| 0.39
| colspan="2" style="text-align:left;" |
|-
| style="background-color:" |
| style="text-align:left;" | Christian Pierrat
| style="text-align:left;" | Ecologist
| ECO
| 
| 0.31
| colspan="2" style="text-align:left;" |
|-
| colspan="8" style="background-color:#E9E9E9;"|
|- style="font-weight:bold"
| colspan="4" style="text-align:left;" | Total
| 
| 100%
| 
| 100%
|-
| colspan="8" style="background-color:#E9E9E9;"|
|-
| colspan="4" style="text-align:left;" | Registered voters
| 
| style="background-color:#E9E9E9;"|
| 
| style="background-color:#E9E9E9;"|
|-
| colspan="4" style="text-align:left;" | Blank/Void ballots
| 
| 2.91%
| 
| 9.81%
|-
| colspan="4" style="text-align:left;" | Turnout
| 
| 58.82%
| 
| 47.30%
|-
| colspan="4" style="text-align:left;" | Abstentions
| 
| 41.18%
| 
| 52.70%
|-
| colspan="8" style="background-color:#E9E9E9;"|
|- style="font-weight:bold"
| colspan="6" style="text-align:left;" | Result
| colspan="2" style="background-color:" | UMP GAIN FROM UDF
|}

Sources

5